Noble County Courthouse may refer to:

Noble County Courthouse (Indiana), Albion, Indiana
Noble County Courthouse (Ohio), Caldwell, Ohio
Noble County Courthouse (Oklahoma), Perry, Oklahoma